Pocahaunted (often shortened by the band to P-haunt) was a hypnagogic pop project based in Los Angeles, California founded in 2005 by Amanda Brown and Bethany Cosentino.

History
Amanda Brown co-founded Not Not Fun Records in 2006; she and friend Bethany Cosentino (of Best Coast) formed the duo Pocahaunted the following year.  The group has released over a dozen albums, a few EPs/singles, and several split releases, generally preferring the vinyl and cassette formats over compact disc.  Their releases often have handmade/hand-painted artwork.  The group has toured heavily since its inception and has had its music released by a wide array of experimental record labels, including ones based in Europe. They disbanded in August 2010.

Music
Pocahaunted's sound has undergone many stylistic shifts.  Their early music was primarily based on improvised drones and filled with disorienting reverb and dub production techniques.  During this time, they often called themselves "The Olsen twins of drone," in a tongue-in-cheek manner.  Cosentino left for New York City to focus on her sunshine pop project Best Coast ca. 2009, necessitating a lineup overhaul for Pocahaunted, including the addition of Brown's husband Britt Brown (a.k.a. Robedoor) on guitar, Diva Dompe (of Blackblack) on bass guitar and vocals, Leyna Noel Tilbor (Psychic Reality) on keyboards and vocals, and M. Geddes Gengras on drums.  The band re-emerged in 2009 with a more upbeat, funk rock-based sound, while retaining dubby bass lines and a tribal overall sound.

Discography

Albums

Moccasinging – Not Not Fun (2006)
A Tear For Every Grain of Sand – Fuck It Tapes (2007)
Pocahaunted – Ruralfaune [France] (2007)
Split w/ Robedoor – Digitalis Recordings (2007)
Rough Magic – Blackest Rainbow (2007)
Chains – Teenage Teardrops (2008)
Peyote Road – Woodist (2008)
Beast That You Are – Night People (2008)
Island Diamonds – Arbor Infinity (LP, 2008) / Not Not Fun (CD w/ 2 bonus tracks, 2008)
Mirror Mics – Weird Forest (2008)
Live From the New Age – Not Not Fun (2009)
Passage – Troubleman Unlimited (2009)
Make It Real – Not Not Fun (LP/CD/cassette) (2010)

EPs and singles

What the Spirit Tells Me – Buried Valley (2006)
Split w/ Mythical Beast – Not Not Fun (2007)
Emerald Snake On Ruby Velvet – Not Not Fun (2007)
Water-Born – Not Not Fun (2007)
Native Seduction – Arbor (2007)
Split w/ Charalambides – Not Not Fun (2008)
Bearskin Rug – Not Not Fun (2008)
Split w/ Orphan Fairytale – Release the Bats [Sweden] (2008)
Gold Miner's Daughters – Excite Bike Tapes (2009)
Threshold – Not Not Fun (2010)

References

External links
Official site
[ Biography] at AllMusic Guide
Discography/reviews at Rate Your Music
Discography at Discogs
Interview in L.A. Record (Pocahaunted cover story), March 2008
Interview in Tiny Mix Tapes, July 2008
Official music video for "Ashes Is White" (2008; dir. by Luis Naranjo)
Partial concert history

Dub musical groups
American experimental rock groups
Musical groups disestablished in 2010
Musical groups from Los Angeles
Hypnagogic pop musicians